Alexandru Constantin Moruzi (1805–1873), a Moldavian, later Romanian politician and member of the Mourousis family, was the Prime Minister of United Principalities between 23 December 1861 and 15 February 1862.

References

1805 births
1873 deaths
Prime Ministers of the Principality of Moldavia
Romanian Ministers of Finance